Andrew Donald Booth (11 February 1918 – 29 November 2009) was a British electrical engineer, physicist and computer scientist, who was an early developer of the magnetic drum memory for computers. He is known for Booth's multiplication algorithm. In his later career in Canada he became president of Lakehead University.

Early life
The son of Sidney Booth (died 1955) a cousin of Sir Felix Booth, he was raised in Weybridge, Surrey, and educated at Haberdashers' Aske's Boys' School. In 1937, he won a scholarship to read mathematics at Jesus College, Cambridge. Booth left Cambridge without taking a degree, having become disaffected with pure mathematics as a subject. He chose an external degree from the University of London instead, which he obtained with a first.

From 1943 to 1945, Booth worked as a mathematical physicist in the X-ray team at the British Rubber Producers' Research Association (BRPRA), Welwyn Garden City, Hertfordshire, gaining his PhD in crystallography from the University of Birmingham in 1944. In 1945, he moved to Birkbeck College, University of London, where his work in the crystallography group led him to build some of the first electronic computers in the United Kingdom including the All Purpose Electronic Computer, first installed at the British Rayon Research Association. Booth founded Birkbeck's department of numerical automation and was recently named a fellow at the university. He also did early pioneering work in machine translation.

Dr. Booth served as President of Lakehead University from 1972 to 1978.

Personal life
Booth married mathematician and computer engineer Kathleen Britten in 1950, and had two children, Amanda and Ian; between 1947 and 1953, together they produced three computing machines.

See also
 Booth's multiplication algorithm

Bibliography 
 
 .
 Booth, A.D. and Britten, K.H.V. (1947) Coding for A.R.C., Institute for Advanced Study, Princeton
 Booth, A.D. and Britten, K.H.V. (1947) General considerations in the design of an all-purpose electronic digital computer, Institute for Advance Study, Princeton
 Booth, A.D. and Britten, K.H.V. (1948) The accuracy of atomic co-ordinates derived from Fourier series in X-ray crystallography Part V, Proc. Roy. Soc. Vol A 193 pp305–310
 The Electronic Principles of Digital Computers, Electronics Forum (1948);
 .
 Booth, A.D (1949) A Magnetic Digital Storage System, Electronic Engineering
 Booth, A.D. (1950) The Physical Realization of An Electronic Digital Computer, Electronic Engineering
 Booth, A.D. (1952)  On Optimum Relations Between Circuit Elements and Logical Symbols in the Design of Electronic Calculators, Journal of British Institution of Radio Engineers
 Booth, A.D. and Booth K.H.V. (1953) Automatic Digital Calculators, Butterworth-Heinmann (Academic Press) London

References

External links
The APEXC driver page
Principles and Progress in the Construction of High-Speed Digital Computers
Andrew Booth Collection, University of Manchester Library.

1918 births
2009 deaths
People educated at Haberdashers' Boys' School
Academics of Birkbeck, University of London
Alumni of Jesus College, Cambridge
Alumni of the University of Birmingham
Alumni of the University of London
British electrical engineers
British computer scientists
Computer designers
History of computing in the United Kingdom
Academic staff of Lakehead University
British expatriate academics in Canada
Canadian university and college chief executives